Brigadier general  Vũ Văn Giai (12 May 193413 October 2012) was a general in the South Vietnamese Army of the Republic of Vietnam (ARVN).

Military career
He served as deputy commander of the 1st Division. From 16 April to October 1971 he commanded division elements in Operation Lam Son 720 against PAVN bases in the A Sầu Valley. In June 1971 he was responsible for the division’s actions around Firebase Fuller.

He was appointed as the original commander of the 3rd Division on its formation in November 1971.

In an interview with The New York Times in early February 1972 he and 1st Division commander General Phạm Văn Phú expressed doubts about the widely anticipated PAVN offensive in the northern provinces in mid-February, stating that no major action would take place until March at the earliest due to the need for the PAVN to build up their logistics.

Following the defeat of the 3rd Division in the First Battle of Quảng Trị in April 1972 he was made a scapegoat for the loss of Quảng Trị Province. While the new I Corps commander General Ngô Quang Trưởng wanted to keep him as commander of the 3rd Division he was overruled by President Nguyễn Văn Thiệu. On 3 May he was relieved of command and placed under investigation. A U.S. official stated at the time that he "was just overwhelmed by the problems that he faced in the invasion."

On 2 October 1973 he was found guilty of abandoning his post by a military court and was sentenced to five years' hard labor.

References

Army of the Republic of Vietnam generals
South Vietnamese military personnel of the Vietnam War
1934 births
2012 deaths